Nick Hopkins is a British investigative journalist and broadcaster, known for his work for The Guardian newspaper and the BBC’s Newsnight television program.

Career

Investigative work 
Nick Hopkins was a member of the investigative team at The Guardian responsible for publishing the Edward Snowden leaks in 2013, work which was awarded with the Pulitzer prize. In 2014, he was, in a move publicized by the BBC, recruited to work with the Newsnight program, referring to his career-spanning admiration of the show as a motivator behind the switch.   

In January 2016, Hopkins returned to The Guardian as head of investigations. Shortly thereafter, the newspaper disbanded the incumbent investigative team, asking members to seek other positions within the organization.  As of January 2018, Hopkins retains his role as head of investigations at The Guardian.

Earlier career 
In the announcement of his recruitment by the BBC in 2014, Hopkins stated he had worked in journalism for over two decades. He describes his career as having started at the Surrey Comet and later, the Wolverhampton Express & Star. 

In 1994, Hopkins joined the Daily Mail, ultimately serving as the nationwide paper's New York Correspondent. His first, 16-year stint at The Guardian began in 1998 and lasted until 2014, and included roles as a national and foreign news editor, four years as Crime Correspondent and three years as Defence and Security Editor. 

In a verified profile on the journalist profiling site Muckrack, Hopkins also lists journalistic work experience with Yahoo, The Irish Times, AlterNet, CIO Today, Teton Valley News and Der Freitag.

External links 
 Nick Hopkins' profile at The Guardian
 Nick Hopkins' Twitter profile
 Playlist of Hopkins' reporting on BBC Newsnight's Youtube account

References  

Year of birth missing (living people)
Living people
The Guardian journalists
British investigative journalists